Confederate Printing Plant is a historic industrial building located at Columbia, South Carolina. It was built in 1864, and is a large two-story, Greek Revival style brick structure. Originally it was a one-story structure, but enlarged to two-stories after the building was burned in February 1865 by General William Tecumseh Sherman’s army.  It was built by the Evans and Cogswell Company for the manufacture of Confederate bonds and other printing purposes.  During the 20th century, it was used as a liquor warehouse by the South Carolina Dispensary and is presently used as a Publix grocery store and residential condominiums.

It was added to the National Register of Historic Places in 1979.

References

Industrial buildings and structures on the National Register of Historic Places in South Carolina
Greek Revival architecture in South Carolina
Industrial buildings completed in 1865
Buildings and structures in Columbia, South Carolina
National Register of Historic Places in Columbia, South Carolina
1865 establishments in South Carolina